The Hesse normal form named after Otto Hesse, is an equation used in analytic geometry, and describes a line in  or a plane in Euclidean space  or a hyperplane in higher dimensions. It is primarily used for calculating distances (see point-plane distance and point-line distance). 

It is written in vector notation as

The dot  indicates the scalar product or dot product.
Vector  points from the origin of the coordinate system, O, to any point P that lies precisely in plane or on line E. The vector  represents the unit normal vector of plane or line E.  The distance  is the shortest distance from the origin O to the plane or line.

Derivation/Calculation from the normal form 

Note: For simplicity, the following derivation discusses the 3D case. However, it is also applicable in 2D.

In the normal form,

a plane is given by a normal vector  as well as an arbitrary position vector  of a point .

By dividing the normal vector  by its magnitude , we obtain the unit (or normalized) normal vector

and the above equation can be rewritten as

Substituting

we obtain the Hesse normal form

In this diagram, d is the distance from the origin.

References

External links 

Analytic geometry